GRK Ohrid is a handball club from Ohrid, North Macedonia. They compete in the domestic Macedonian Handball Super League.

History
GRK Ohrid was founded in 2011 in Ohrid.

In the first 2 seasons, they competed in the First Macedonian Handball League. The 2013-14 season was their first season in Macedonian Handball Super League, when they finished on 8th position.

Their first qualification in Play-off phase was season 2015-16, when they finished second in Regular season and 5th in play-off. Season after that they were placed 3rd at the end, so they qualified for 2017–18 EHF Cup qualification.

Ohrid Arena
The Biljanini Izvori Sports Arena is a multi-functional indoor sports arena. It is located in Ohrid, North Macedonia. The sports hall was inaugurated in August 1998 and has a capacity of 4,000 seats for handball and 4,500 for basketball. It is used by several handball and basketball teams from Ohrid. It was one of two venues used during the 2008 European Women's Handball Championship.

European record

EHF Cup

Team

Current squad
Squad for the 2022–23 season

Goalkeepers 
1  Aleksandar Milenković
 12  Zurab Tsintsadze
 16  Viktor Vasilevski
Left Wingers
4  Krste Andonoski (c)
7  Xazein Rustamov
 17  Nikola Risteski
Right Wingers
5  Balša Čejović
 44  Gal Cirar
Line players
 10  Kristijan Dimitrieski
 19  Ivan Taseski
 32  Vladimir Bojanić

Left Backs
 10  Stefan Drogrishki
 14  Daniel Andonovski
 23  Vladimir Naumoski
 34  Abderrahim Boudrali
Central Backs
 28  Eray Karakoç
  Jakša Vještica
Right Backs
 26  Dejan Šešić

Transfers
Transfers for the season 2023–24

Joining
  Vladan Kastratović (CB) (back from loan at  MRK Kumanovo)
  Nikola Šipinkoski (RB) (back from loan at  RK Kičevo)

Leaving

Staff

Professional staff

Management

Retired numbers

Notable former players

  Blagojče Trajkovski
  Kiril Kolev
  Milan Levov
  Toše Ončev
  Nikola Danilovski
  Mihajlo Mladenovikj
  Martin Manaskov
  Igor Čagalj
  Darko Pavlović
  Eldin Vražalica
  Lazar Adamović
  Lazar Petrović
  Aleksa Milošević
  Stefan Dodić
  Filip Grubor
  Denis Tot
  Josip Kežić
  Marko Kobetić
  Tomislav Kljaić
  Jagoš Braunović
  Filip Krivokapić
  Derviš Birdahić
  Lekso Tsitelishvili
  Jalil Machou
  Halil Öztürk
  Malik Hoggas

Notable former coaches

  Goran Andonovski
  Radoslav Stojanović

References

Handball clubs in North Macedonia
Sport in Ohrid